L'Avenir ("The Future") was a bimonthly magazine published in Tonkin, launched in March 1936. L'Avenir was the organ of the Vietnamese branch of SFIO. The staff of l'Avenir included Võ Nguyên Giáp, Phan Anh, Dang Thai Mai, Vu Dinh Huynh and Bui Ngoc Ai.

References

1936 establishments in Vietnam
Bi-monthly magazines
Defunct political magazines
French Section of the Workers' International
Magazines established in 1936
Magazines with year of disestablishment missing
Socialist magazines
Magazines published in Vietnam